This is a discography for the singer Lloyd.

Studio albums

EPs

Mixtape

Singles

As lead artist

As featured artist

Promotional singles

Other charted songs

Guest appearances

Notes

References

Rhythm and blues discographies
 
 
Discographies of American artists